Făurei may refer to several places in Romania:

Făurei, a town in Brăila County
Făurei, Neamț, a commune in Neamț County
Făurei, a village in Ulmu Commune, Călărași County
Făurei, a village administered by Băneasa Commune, Constanța County
Făurei, a village in Garoafa Commune, Vrancea County
Făurei-Sat, a village in Surdila-Greci Commune, Brăila County